On November 15, 1996, the District of Columbia held a U.S. House of Representatives election for its shadow representative. Unlike its non-voting delegate, the shadow representative is only recognized by the district and is not officially sworn or seated. One-term incumbent John Capozzi declined to run for reelection and was succeeded by fellow Democrat Sabrina Sojourner.

Primary elections
Primary elections were held on September 10.

Democratic primary

Candidates
 Sabrina Sojourner, management consultant

Declined to run
 John Capozzi, incumbent Shadow Representative (Ran for City Council at-large)

Results

Other primaries
Primaries were held for the Republican, Statehood, and Umoja parties but no candidates were on the ballot and only write-in votes were cast.

Other candidates

Republican
 Gloria Corn, writer and candidate for Shadow Representative in 1992

General election
The general election took place on November 15.

Results

References

Washington, D.C., Shadow Representative elections
1996 elections in Washington, D.C.